Dulalthok is a village located in Panchkhal Municipality of Kavrepalanchok, Nepal. It lies about 6 km east of Dhulikhel; it's district headquarter. Its altitude extends from 870 m to 1100 m above the sea level.

Name
The name comes from combination of Dulal, surname of a Hindu Brahmin community, meaning wanderer and thok meaning abode.

Health and Education
Dulalthok was declared open defecation free zone in 2008 .

References

External links
 

Populated places in Kavrepalanchok District